Lenny is a 1974 American biographical drama film about the comedian Lenny Bruce, starring Dustin Hoffman and directed by Bob Fosse. The screenplay by Julian Barry is based on his play of the same name.

Plot
The film jumps between various sections of Bruce's life, including scenes of when he was in his prime and the burned-out, strung-out performer who, in the twilight of his life, used his nightclub act to pour out his personal frustrations. We watch as up-and-coming Bruce courts his "Shiksa goddess," a stripper named Honey. With family responsibilities, Lenny is encouraged to do a "safe" act, but he cannot do it. Constantly in trouble for flouting obscenity laws, Lenny develops a near-messianic complex which fuels both his comedy genius and his talent for self-destruction. Worn out by a lifetime of tilting at establishment windmills, Lenny Bruce dies of a morphine overdose in 1966.

Cast
 Dustin Hoffman as Lenny Bruce
 Valerie Perrine as Honey Bruce
 Jan Miner as Sally Marr
 Stanley Beck as Artie Silver
 Rashel Novikoff as Aunt Mema
 Gary Morton as Sherman Hart
 Guy Rennie as Jack Goldman
 Aldo Demeo as Bailiff

Release
Lenny opened at Cinema I in New York City on November 10, 1974, and grossed a house record $14,981 in its first day.

Reception

Critical response
On Rotten Tomatoes, the film has an approval rating of 89% based on 27 reviews. The critical consensus reads: "Dustin Hoffman inhabits Lenny Bruce with nervy energy in Bob Fosse's richly stylized telling of the pioneering comedian's career and downfall." On Metacritic, it has a score of 61 out of 100, based on 9 critic reviews, indicating "generally favorable reviews".

One of the less enthusiastic reviews came from Roger Ebert stating "Unless we go in convinced that Lenny Bruce was an important performer, the movie doesn't convince us."

In 2012, British film critic Mark Kermode put Hoffman's performance as Lenny Bruce at number eight in a top-ten video of Hoffman's best performances.

Accolades

Home media
Lenny was released to DVD by MGM Home Video on April 1, 2003, as a Region 1 widescreen DVD and by Twilight Time (under license from MGM and 20th Century Fox Home Entertainment) as a Region 1 widescreen Blu-ray Disc on February 10, 2015.

See also
 List of American films of 1974
 List of black-and-white films produced since 1970
 George Carlin

References

External links
 
 
 

1970s biographical drama films
1974 LGBT-related films
1974 films
American biographical drama films
American black-and-white films
American films based on plays
American LGBT-related films
Biographical films about entertainers
Films about comedians
Films about freedom of expression
Films directed by Bob Fosse
Films set in the 1950s
Films set in the 1960s
Cultural depictions of Lenny Bruce
United Artists films
Films about censorship
1974 drama films
1970s English-language films
1970s American films